Josef Kodíček (24 January 1892 – November 1954) was a Czech journalist and theatre critic. During the 1930s, he was a part of the Friday Men circle which used to meet at Karel Čapek's house in Prague.

References

1892 births
1954 deaths
Czech journalists
20th-century journalists